Joseph Gonzales (born 6 August 1941) is a boxer from  France.

He competed for France in the 1964 Summer Olympics held in Tokyo, Japan in the light-middleweight event where he finished in second place.

1964 Olympic boxing results
Below are Joseph Gonzales' results from the 1964 Olympic boxing tournament in Tokyo where he competed in the light middleweight division:

 Round of 32: bye
 Round of 16: Defeated Koji Masuda (Japan) by a 3-2 decision
 Quarterfinal: Defeated Anthony Barber (Australia); referee stopped contest
 Semifinal: Defeated Najim Masyegun (Nigeria) by decision 3-2
 Final: Lost to Boris Lagutin (Soviet Union) by a 1-4 decision (was awarded silver medal)

References

Sports-reference

1941 births
Olympic boxers of France
Olympic silver medalists for France
Boxers at the 1964 Summer Olympics
Living people
Olympic medalists in boxing
French male boxers
Medalists at the 1964 Summer Olympics
Light-middleweight boxers